The Pfeifer Brothers Department Store is a historic commercial building at 522-24 South Main Street in downtown Little Rock, Arkansas. It is a large three story brick structure, with load bearing brick walls and internal steel framing. The ground floor is lined with commercial plate glass display windows, separated by brick pilasters capped with capitals made of terra cotta.

Entrances appear on facades facing both Main and Sixth Streets. Above the third-floor windows on the Main Street facade there are round-arch elements with small round windows above, while the Sixth Street facade has corbelled brick elements in the same area. Built in 1899 by the Lasker Brothers to a design by Charles L. Thompson, it was for many years home to the Pfeifer Brothers store, one of the city's leading department stores.

The building was listed on the National Register of Historic Places in 2000.

See also
National Register of Historic Places listings in Little Rock, Arkansas

References

Commercial buildings on the National Register of Historic Places in Arkansas
Romanesque Revival architecture in Arkansas
Commercial buildings completed in 1899
Buildings and structures in Little Rock, Arkansas
National Register of Historic Places in Little Rock, Arkansas
Historic district contributing properties in Arkansas
1899 establishments in Arkansas